The Tamil Nadu women's football team is an Indian women's football team representing Tamil Nadu in the Senior Women's National Football Championship. They have appeared in the Santosh Trophy finals once, and won the trophy at their maiden attempt at the 2017–18 edition by defeating the reigning champions Manipur.

Honours
 Senior Women's National Football Championship
 Winners (1): 2017–18

National Games
 Bronze medal (1): 2022

 Junior Girl's National Football Championship
 Winners (2): 2008–09, 2018–19
 Runners-up (1): 2006–07

References

Football in Tamil Nadu
Women's football teams in India
Year of establishment missing